Otto Reinwald (23 August 1899 – 1 July 1968) was a German film actor. The elder brother of the actresses Grete Reinwald and Hanni Reinwald, he made his screen debut in 1913 as a child actor. He later became a production manager, active in the post-war German film industry. He was also credited as a cinematographer for the 1959 film Hunting Party.

Selected filmography

Actor
 The Mysterious X (1914)
 The Silent Mill (1914)
 Rosenmontag (1924)
 Nanon (1924)
 Father Voss (1925)
 The Old Ballroom (1925)
 The Circus Princess (1925)
 Anne-Liese of Dessau (1925)
 Joyless Street (1925)
 Oh Those Glorious Old Student Days (1925)
 The Iron Bride (1925)
 Two Under the Stars (1927)
 Today I Was With Frieda (1928)
 Autumn on the Rhine (1928)
 Misled Youth (1929)
 There Was Once a Loyal Hussar (1929)
 The Youths (1929)
 Only on the Rhine (1930)
 Marriage in Name Only (1930)
 Alarm at Midnight (1931)
 Operation Edelweiss (1954)

Production manager
 Das war mein Leben (1944)
 The Original Sin (1948)
 The Time with You (1948)
 Hello, Fraulein! (1949)
 Tromba (1949)
 Einmaleins der Ehe (1949)
 Kein Engel ist so rein (1950)
 Two in One Suit (1950)
 Hanna Amon (1951)
 The Bachelor Trap (1953)
 Ave Maria(1953)
 The Night Without Morals (1953)

References

Bibliography
 Eisner, Lotte H. The Haunted Screen: Expressionism in the German Cinema and the Influence of Max Reinhardt. University of California Press, 2008.

External links

1899 births
1968 deaths
German male film actors
German male child actors
People from Konstanz